The 3rd 10 Hours of Messina was a sports car race, held on 25 July 1954 in the street circuit of Messina, Italy.

Final standings
 Started:	39	
 Classified:	23

See also
 Messina Grand Prix (auto race that replaced it)

References

External links
 Ai fratelli Sgorbati la "10 ore" di Messina at Istituto Luce archive
 La 10 Ore di Messina, la storia 

10 Hours of Messina